Charles Herbert James (16 June 1817 – 10 October 1890) was a Welsh politician. He was elected as a Liberal Member of Parliament for Merthyr Tydfil in 1880, resigning in 1888 by becoming Steward of the Manor of Northstead.

References

External links 
 

1817 births
1890 deaths
Liberal Party (UK) MPs for Welsh constituencies
UK MPs 1880–1885
UK MPs 1885–1886
UK MPs 1886–1892